A flow-based generative model is a generative model used in machine learning that explicitly models a probability distribution by leveraging normalizing flow, which is a statistical method using the change-of-variable law of probabilities to transform a simple distribution into a complex one.

The direct modeling of likelihood provides many advantages. For example, the negative log-likelihood can be directly computed and minimized as the loss function. Additionally, novel samples can be generated by sampling from the initial distribution, and applying the flow transformation.

In contrast, many alternative generative modeling methods such as variational autoencoder (VAE) and generative adversarial network do not explicitly represent the likelihood function.

Method 

Let  be a (possibly multivariate) random variable with distribution .

The functions  should be invertible, i.e. the inverse function  exists. The final output  models the target distribution.

 

To efficiently compute the log likelihood, the functions  should be 1. easy to invert, and 2. easy to compute the determinant of its Jacobian. In practice, the functions  are modeled using deep neural networks, and are trained to minimize the negative log-likelihood of data samples from the target distribution. These architectures are usually designed such that only the forward pass of the neural network is required in both the inverse and the Jacobian determinant calculations. Examples of such architectures include NICE, RealNVP, and Glow.

Derivation of log likelihood 

Note that .

 

By the inverse function theorem:

 

By the identity  (where  is an invertible matrix), we have:

 

The log likelihood is thus:

 

Since  is equal to  subtracted by a non-recursive term, we can infer by induction that:

Training method 
As is generally done when training a deep learning model, the goal with normalizing flows is to minimize the Kullback–Leibler divergence between the model's likelihood and the target distribution to be estimated. Denoting  the model's likelihood and  the target distribution to learn, the (forward) KL-divergence is:

 

The second term on the right-hand side of the equation corresponds to the entropy of the target distribution and is independent of the parameter  we want the model to learn, which only leaves the expectation of the negative log-likelihood to minimize under the target distribution. This intractable term can be approximated with a Monte-Carlo method. Indeed, if we have a dataset  of samples each independently drawn from the target distribution , then this term can be computed as:

 

Therefore, the learning objective

 
is replaced by 
 

In other words, minimizing the Kullback–Leibler divergence between the model's likelihood and the target distribution is equivalent to maximizing the model likelihood under observed samples of the target distribution.

A pseudocode for training normalizing flows is as follows:

 INPUT. dataset , normalizing flow model .
 SOLVE.  by gradient descent
 RETURN.

Variants

Planar Flow 
The earliest example. Fix some activation function , and let  with th appropriate dimensions, thenThe inverse  has no closed-form solution in general.

For it to be invertible everywhere, it must be nonzero everywhere. For example,  and  satisfies the requirement.

Nonlinear Independent Components Estimation (NICE) 
Let  be even-dimensional, and split them in the middle. Then the normalizing flow functions arewhere  is any neural network with weights .

 is just , and the Jacobian is just 1, that is, the flow is volume-preserving.

When , this is seen as a curvy shearing along the  direction.

Real Non-Volume Preserving (Real NVP) 
The Real Non-Volume Preserving model generalizes NICE model by:

The NICE model is recovered by setting .
Since the Real NVP map keeps the first and second halves of the vector  separate, it's usually required to add a permutation  after every Real NVP layer.

Generative Flow (Glow) 
In generative flow model, each layer has 3 parts:

 channel-wise affine transformwith Jacobian .
 invertible 1x1 convolutionwith Jacobian . Here  is any invertible matrix.
 Real NVP, with Jacobian as described in Real NVP.

The idea of using the invertible 1x1 convolution is to permute all layers in general, instead of merely permuting the first and second half, as in Real NVP.

Masked autoregressive flow (MAF) 

By the reparametrization trick, the autoregressive model is generalized to a normalizing flow:The autoregressive model is recovered by setting .

The forward mapping is slow (because it's sequential), but the backward mapping is fast (because it's parallel).

Continuous Normalizing Flow (CNF) 

Instead of constructing flow by function composition, another approach is to formulate the flow as a continuous-time dynamic. Let  be the latent variable with distribution . Map this latent variable to data space with the following flow function:

 

where  is an arbitrary function and can be modeled with e.g. neural networks.

The inverse function is then naturally:

 

And the log-likelihood of  can be found as:

 

Since the trace depends only on the diagonal of the Jacobian , this allows "free-form" Jacobian. Here, "free-form" means that there is no restriction on the Jacobian's form. It is contrasted with previous discrete models of normalizing flow, where the Jacobian is carefully designed to be only upper- or lower-diagonal, so that the Jacobian can be evaluated efficiently.

When  is implemented as a neural network, neural ODE methods would be needed. Indeed, CNF was first proposed in the same paper that proposed neural ODE.

There are two main deficiencies of CNF, one is that a continuous flow must be a homeomorphism, thus preserve orientation and ambient isotopy (for example, it's impossible to flip a left-hand to a right-hand by continuous deforming of space, and it's impossible to turn a sphere inside out, or undo a knot), and the other is that the learned flow  might be ill-behaved, due to degeneracy (that is, there are an infinite number of possible  that all solve the same problem).

By adding extra dimensions, the CNF gains enough freedom to reverse orientation and go beyond ambient isotopy (just like how one can pick up a polygon from a desk and flip it around in 3-space, or unknot a knot in 4-space), yielding the "augmented neural ODE".

To regularize the flow , one can impose regularization losses. The paper  proposed the following regularization loss based on optimal transport theory:where  are hyperparameters. The first term punishes the model for varying the flow field over time, and the second term punishes it for varying the flow field over space.

Downsides 
Despite normalizing flows success in estimating high-dimensional densities, some downsides still exist in their designs. First of all, their latent space where input data is projected onto is not a lower-dimensional space and therefore, flow-based models do not allow for compression of data by default and require a lot of computation. However, it is still possible to perform image compression with them.

Flow-based models are also notorious for failing in estimating the likelihood of out-of-distribution samples (i.e.: samples that were not drawn from the same distribution as the training set). Some hypotheses were formulated to explain this phenomenon, among which the typical set hypothesis, estimation issues when training models, or fundamental issues due to the entropy of the data distributions.

One of the most interesting properties of normalizing flows is the invertibility of their learned bijective map. This property is given by constraints in the design of the models (cf.: RealNVP, Glow) which guarantee theoretical invertibility. The integrity of the inverse is important in order to ensure the applicability of the change-of-variable theorem, the computation of the Jacobian of the map as well as sampling with the model. However, in practice this invertibility is violated and the inverse map explodes because of numerical imprecision.

Applications 

Flow-based generative models have been applied on a variety of modeling tasks, including:
 Audio generation
 Image generation
 Molecular graph generation
 Point-cloud modeling
 Video generation
 Lossy image compression

References

External links 
 Flow-based Deep Generative Models
 Normalizing flow models

Machine learning
Statistical models
Probabilistic models